Onna Irukka Kathukanum is a 1992 Indian Tamil language comedy drama film directed by V. Sekhar. The film stars Sivakumar, while an ensemble supporting cast includes Manorama, Vinu Chakravarthy, Goundamani, Senthil, S. S. Chandran, Charle, Kovai Sarala, Supergood Kannan and Jeeva, amongst others. It was released on 20 November 1992.

Plot 

The story begins with a group of government officers coming to list the number of devastated houses. The officers promised them to give a big amount to build their house but in exchange for a little amount to register their name. So the illiterate villagers, who wants to make easy money, demolish their house. The officers turn out to be frauds. The village panchayat president knows that the villagers will not interfere in his decision until they are uneducated. Sivaraman, a new school teacher, tries to change their custom and the children are happy to learn at school. Soon, Sivaraman has trouble with the village head.

Cast 

Sivakumar as Sivaraman
Manorama
Vinu Chakravarthy as President
Goundamani as Sudalai
Senthil as Pichumani (Beggar Bell)
S. S. Chandran as Venkatraman Iyer
Charle as Issaki
Kovai Sarala as Kaattayi
Supergood Kannan
Jeeva as Rasathi
Kumarimuthu as Pavadai
Tirupur Ramasamy
K.K.Soundar as Andiappan
Idichapuli Selvaraj
MLA Thangaraj
Chelladurai
Suryakanth
Kovai Senthil
Master Sirajudeen as Venkatraman Iyer's son

Soundtrack 
The music was composed by Ilaiyaraaja, with lyrics written by Vaali, Pulamaipithan, Gangai Amaran and Piraisoodan.

Reception 
Malini Mannath of The Indian Express said "Onna Irukka Kathukanum may not be slick, but it has a message to deliver. It has been told with warmth and humour".

References

External links 

1990s Tamil-language films
1992 comedy-drama films
1992 films
Films about the caste system in India
Films directed by V. Sekhar
Films scored by Ilaiyaraaja
Indian comedy-drama films